Orideetse Thela (born 12 July 1983) is a Botswana male badminton player.

Achievements

BWF International Challenge/Series
Men's Doubles

 BWF International Challenge tournament
 BWF International Series tournament
 BWF Future Series tournament

References

External links 
 

Living people
1983 births
Botswana male badminton players
Competitors at the 2011 All-Africa Games
Competitors at the 2015 African Games
African Games competitors for Botswana